The Moreland-Hoffstot House in the Shadyside neighborhood of Pittsburgh, Pennsylvania is a building from 1914. It was listed on the National Register of Historic Places in 1978.

References

Houses on the National Register of Historic Places in Pennsylvania
Houses in Pittsburgh
Houses completed in 1914
City of Pittsburgh historic designations
Pittsburgh History & Landmarks Foundation Historic Landmarks
National Register of Historic Places in Pittsburgh
1914 establishments in Pennsylvania
Gilded Age mansions